Gyaman (also spelled Jamang, Gyaaman) was a medieval Akan people state, located in what is now the Bono region of Ghana and Ivory Coast.

See also
Akan people
Ghana
Gold Coast
Lists of incumbents

References

Lists of African rulers
Rulers
Ivory Coast-related lists